Brawijaya can refer to any of several things:

 Prabu Brawijaya, King of Majapahit Empire.
 Universitas Brawijaya (University of Brawijaya), a state university in Malang, Indonesia. 
 Kodam V/Brawijaya, a military area command of the Indonesian Army, as the 5th Kodam.
 Brawijaya Stadium, a multi-use stadium in Kediri, Indonesia.
 Gelora Brawijaya Stadium, a stadium in Surabaya, Indonesia.